Phillip Island (Boonwurrung: Corriong, Worne or Millowl) is an Australian island about  south-southeast of Melbourne, Victoria. The island is named after Governor Arthur Phillip, the first Governor of New South Wales, by explorer and seaman George Bass, who sailed in an whaleboat, arriving from Sydney on 5 January 1798.

Phillip Island forms a natural breakwater for the shallow waters of the Western Port. It has  of coastline and is part of the Bass Coast Shire.

A  concrete bridge (originally a wooden bridge) connects the mainland town San Remo with the island town Newhaven. In the 2016 census, the island's permanent population was 10,387, compared to 7,071 in 2001. During the summer, the population swells to 40,000. 60% of the island is farmland devoted to grazing of sheep and cattle.

History
The earliest inhabitants of the area were the Yalloc Bulluk clan of the Bunurong people, Indigenous Australians of the Kulin nation. In the Bunwurrung language the island is known as corriong or millowl. Their coastal territory with its sheltered bays meant that the Yalloc Bulluk, along with other Bunurong clans, were among the first Aboriginal people in Victoria to have contact with European mariners.

Following reports of the 1798 exploration by George Bass and Matthew Flinders, the area was frequented by sealers from Van Diemen's Land, whose interaction with the Bunurong people was not without conflict. In 1801, navigator James Grant visited the adjoining Churchill Island (which he named) and planted a crop of corn and wheat. In 1826, the scientific voyage of Dumont d'Urville, in command of the corvette Astrolabe, led to British concerns of an attempt by the French to establish a colony in Western Port.

While the French colonisation did not eventuate, Wetherall reported on finding a sealer's camp and also two acres of wheat and corn. A fort was constructed near Rhyll, and named Dumaresq after the Governor's private secretary. The 'abundance' of wood, quality soil and the discovery of coal at Cape Woolamai, were mentioned in newspaper accounts. Wetherall also erected a flag staff on 'the flat-top'd rock off Point Grant' (commonly known today as The Nobbies) on the Island's Western extremity as a marker for the harbour entrance.

Of his encounters with the Bunurong people, Wetherall told Darling:
"The Natives appear numerous, but we have not been able to obtain an interview, as they desert their camp, and run into the woods on our approach, watching our movements until we depart. As I am aware it is Your Excellency's wish to conciliate them as much as possible, I have not allowed them to be pursued, or molested in any way."

The only reservation Wetherall had was on the Island's supply of water; he dug a 'tide-well' near the fort but assessed the source as 'not in sufficient quantities for the supply of shipping' and this problem would lead to the eventual move to Settlement Point on the mainland coast.

The water question was again addressed, by Captain Moore, who accompanied Surveyor Robert Hoddle in 1840, that 'water can be obtained on Phillip Island, near the best anchorage, off Sandy Point.'

In 1835 Samuel Anderson established the third permanent settlement in what would be Victoria at the mainland site of Bass across the bay from Phillip Island.

In 1841, brothers John David and William McHaffie, were granted Phillip Island as a squatting run and took possession in 1842. The McHaffies, and later settlers, assisted the Victorian Acclimatisation society (forerunner of the committee which established the Melbourne Zoo) by introducing animals such as pheasants, deer and wallabies to Phillip Island.

Plans for the first bridge to the Island, from San Remo to Newhaven commenced in 1938, at a cost of £50,000, with the official opening by Premier Albert Dunstan taking place in November 1940. A full public holiday was declared on the Island to celebrate.

Environment

Wildlife

The southern and western coasts of the island lie within the Phillip Island Important Bird Area, so identified by BirdLife International because of its importance in supporting significant populations of little penguins, short-tailed shearwaters and Pacific gulls. In addition, there is a wildlife park where wallabies and kangaroos roam freely amongst the visitors and can be fed by hand. Seal Rocks, at the western end of the island, hosts the largest colony of fur seals in Australia (up to 16,000). In recent years, other than local population of critically endangered endemic Burrunan dolphins or migratory killer whales, southern right whales and humpback whales are starting to show recoveries in the area long after commercial and illegal hunts by the Soviet Union with the help of Japan in 1970s, and the numbers using the area as nursery are growing rapidly, allowing a rise in hopes to establish commercial whale watching activities in the vicinity of the island.

Climate
In terms of climate classification Phillip Island features an oceanic climate with cool-summer-mediterranean climate characteristics such as a relatively dry summer. Phillip Island experiences milder weather than Melbourne and is tempered by ocean breezes. In terms of temperature averages it has more in common with the climate of northern areas of New Zealand than with most of Australia. The prevailing wind for most of the year is a south-westerly which blows in off Bass Strait.

Phillip Island's Grand Prix motorcycle race is traditionally held in October, often seeing unreliable and fickle weather conditions, such as very cold surface temperatures and extreme wind.

On 10 August 2005, snow was observed on the island. This was a very unusual event.

Tourism
Phillip Island is a tourist destination visited by 3.5 million people annually. The Penguin Parade at Phillip Island Nature Park, in which little penguins come ashore in groups, attracts visitors from all over the world. They come to see one of the few areas where this species of penguin can be seen. Phillip Island is home to approximately 32,000 penguins, which can be seen by tourists at sunset every day of the year.

The island is recognised as having some of the most consistently reliable and varied surf conditions in the country. The island has hosted various surf events in the past, such as the Rip Curl Pro and the Roxy Pro Women's Surfing Festival.

Other events include the Churchill Island Working Horse and Pioneer Festival.

Motorsport

Phillip Island is steeped in the history of Australian motor racing. A temporary circuit utilizing the island's interior public roads was used for the inaugural Australian Grand Prix in 1928 and continued to be used for the race up until 1935. Racing on public road circuits continued through to 1940. In 1952 the Phillip Island Auto Racing Club was formed and commenced construction on the permanent Phillip Island Grand Prix Circuit which opened in 1956. In 1960, the inaugural Armstrong 500 was held, although, with the bridge to the mainland unable to support heavy hotmix bitumen equipment, the track broke up during the third running of the race in 1962. The damage rendered the circuit unusable for racing and for 1963 the Armstrong 500 was relocated to the Mount Panorama Circuit and over time evolved into what is known today as the Bathurst 1000.

The circuit was refurbished and was reopened in October 1967. It was closed in 1978, but was redeveloped and re-opened in 1988 and the following year hosted the first international version of the Australian motorcycle Grand Prix. It continues to host the race today and is also a venue for rounds of the Superbike World Championship, the Moto GP Championship, the V8 Supercars Championship and the Australian Drivers' Championship.

Localities
Towns on the island include:

Notable residents
Chris, Liam, and Luke Hemsworth, actors
Nikki van Dijk, professional surfer
Sam Docherty, AFL footballer

See also
Western Port
French Island
Mornington Peninsula and Western Port Biosphere Reserve

References

External links

Official Phillip Island Tourism Association website
Phillip Island Nature Park website

 
Western Port
Tourist attractions in Victoria (Australia)
Penguin colonies